The Taipei Grand Mosque or Taipei Zheng He Mosque is the largest and oldest mosque in Taiwan. Located in the Da'an District of Taipei City, it is Taiwan's most important Islamic structure.

History

First building
After the handover of Taiwan from Japan to China in 1945, the Chinese Muslim Association (CMA) in Nanking appointed Chang Zichun (常子春), Wang Jingzhai (王靜齋) and Zheng Houren (鄭厚仁) to form the preparatory committee of the CMA branch in Taiwan on 23 December 1947.

Later, since many Chinese Muslims that came to Taiwan could not find any place to pray, they raised money to build the very first mosque in Taiwan. They built the mosque at No. 2, Lane 17, Lishui Street (麗水街), Da'an District, Taipei City by converting a Japanese-style house into a 992 m2 prayer area. The land was donated by Chang Tze-chun and Cheng Hou-ren. Muslims from Mainland China started to pray in that mosque in August 1948. With the growing number of Chinese Muslims with the KMT government, the mosque suddenly became too small to accommodate the growing number of worshipers, therefore they had to look for a new bigger place to rebuild the mosque.

No. 2, Lane 17, Lishui Street now houses an apartment building.

Current building

In the latter part of the 1950s after the end of Chinese Civil War and the relocation of the Nationalist Government from Mainland China to Taiwan, Director-General of the CMA Bai Chongxi and ROC Minister of Foreign Affairs George Yeh proposed the construction of a bigger Islamic-style mosque which was designed by the famous architect Yang Cho-cheng. Under the leader Bai Chongxi, director-general Shi Zizhou (時子周) and the board chairman Chang Zixuan (常子萱), the mosque was constructed by the Continental Engineering Corporation on a 2,747 m2 land donated by the government at the Xinsheng South Street (新生南路). ROC Vice President Chen Cheng led the inauguration ceremony of the mosque on 13 April 1960.

The cost of the construction was covered by the CMA with funding of $150,000 from the Shah of Iran and King of Jordan, $100,000 loaned by the Kuomintang government and loan from the Bank of Taiwan. The congregation had already repaid half of the bank loan by that time when the ROC government decided to exempt them from having to repay the remaining.

The mosque has strong ties to Saudi Arabia which continues to provide financial support to the mosque. Visiting Saudi Imams come to preach at the mosque during Ramadan. In 1971 the mosque was visited by King Faisal.

The mosque has been visited by other head of states, such as King Hussein of Jordan, Prime Minister Tunku Abdul Rahman of Malaysia and many other prominent Muslim leaders.

In 1999, the mosque faced a risk of being demolished to due a land dispute with a cement company. It was reported that the cement company declared having the ownership of land where the mosque is located. They attempted to dismantle the mosque in order to take back the land. However, under the concerned legislators of the area and from the assistance of Taipei City Government under Taipei Mayor Ma Ying-jeou, the mosque was finally turned into a historic building on 29 June 1999 by the city government as it may preserve diverse cultural development. However, the board of directors of the mosque still had to struggle to solve the land dispute.

Speaking at the mosque in December 2001 during Eid al-Fitr, Mayor Ma thanked the Indonesian workers for their contribution to Taiwan and gave them festive greeting. The mayor was spotted wearing Jinnah cap while greeting the workers and spoke a bit of Indonesian language. He cited that 20,000 among 36,000 foreign workers in Taipei were Indonesians, which had contributed much to the construction and household assistance of Taipei City. He also said that if all of those workers took the same day off, one-quarter of the city would be paralyzed.

On 25 December 2015, vice presidential candidate Wang Ju-hsuan visited the mosque as part of her election campaign. On 29 September 2020, Chunghwa Post released stamps featuring Taipei Grand Mosque and Taichung Mosque with denomination of NT$15 and NT$28 respectively.

Activities

Just like any other mosque, Taipei Grand Mosque is the place for Muslims in Taiwan to perform their five daily prayers, including the Friday prayer on Friday afternoon, Eid prayers, Tarawih prayers in the evening during the fasting month and even the funeral prayers for the deceased.

Taipei Grand Mosque houses the headquarter of CMA, the largest Islamic organization in Taiwan. Prior to its location in Taipei, the CMA was based in Nanking. They do Islamic-related activities throughout Taiwan and has good reputation among local Muslims. The mosque also has its own board of directors that are responsible for the affairs of the mosque. Besides CMA, the mosque also houses the Chinese Islamic Cultural and Educational Foundation.

The mosque has its own active volunteer organization called the Islamic Volunteer Corp., created in 1995. This organization organizes and summons the enthusiastic Muslims to do the Islamic services through the organization. Currently the organization has more than 70 volunteers. They have had several activities and helped the mosque to perform some services for the Muslims.

The mosque receives their fund to run most of their Islamic activities and daily operation cost from private donations. Those related to local affairs, they sometimes seek subsidy from local government agencies. Some organizations such as the Muslim World League and World Assembly of Muslim Youth have helped the mosque as well in assisting on their Islamic activities.

Due to the absence of any formal Islamic education institution in Taiwan, the mosque holds some Islamic courses to the local Muslims such as Arabic language, Quran and Hadith teaching and Sharia. Many of them are being held during the weekends where Taiwanese Muslims have more free time to do such activities.

During the fasting month, Muslims in Taipei hold their fast break at the mosque. Foreign Muslim students and workers also join the event. Simple food such as dates and mineral water are generally served from donations collected during the whole holy month to break their fast, followed by proper dinner meal served by the mosque committees and volunteers.

The mosque opened its door to the public during its building 41st anniversary in April 2001 where it held activities such as photography and exhibitions. The Vice-Imam of the mosque Ishag Ma (馬孝棋) said that the event is not only a cultural celebration, but also as an invitation to those Taiwanese who no longer practice their Muslim faith, such as those living in Lukang Township in Changhua County.

The mosque often host visit by students belonging to other faith and being explained by the Imam so that they can have a better understanding about the teaching of Islam. The mosque also holds inter-religious workshops and debates between Islam and Confucianism, Catholicism and Buddhism to promote mutual understanding with other religions.

People First Party Muslim legislator Liu Wen-hsiung's body was sent to Taipei Grand Mosque, where a funeral prayer was performed before he was buried, after his death on 31 July 2017.

Architecture and structure

Taipei Grand Mosque was built according to Islamic religion and Arabic architecture. It was designed by architect Yang Cho-cheng, the same architect that designed the Taipei Grand Hotel, Chiang Kai-shek Memorial Hall, National Theater and Concert Hall and many other landmark buildings in Taiwan. The main structure was built using reinforced concrete. Muslims both foreign and local gather at the mosque on Fridays between 12:00-2:00 PM. Friday prayer is held between 12:00-1:15 PM. The Imam at the mosque is Omar Ayash (歐馬).

The mosque has an enormous greenish-bronze domed roof at a 15 meters height and 15 meters of diameter, and is supported entirely without beams. It is wrapped by brass sheets. As years gone by, oxidation with air has turned the dome from spangle to verdigris. The dome has two Byzantium style onion-shaped-spires. Crescent decorations sit at the tip of the spires and at the iron railings.

The mosque also has two minarets with a height of 20 meters each located at both ends of the building. The minarets are grey in color with a red-colored neck and an onion-shaped spire on top. The design uses a blend of Taiwanese and Central Asian materials.

It is the largest mosque in Taiwan with a total area of 2,747 square meters and an expansive prayer hall with a height and width of 15 meters. The hall was built according to Islamic traditions where there is Islamic geometric art on the windowpanes. It can accommodate up to 1,000 worshippers and is adorned with handmade Persian rugs and chandeliers presented by kings of countries with allies with the ROC. Initially, the prayer hall was only located on the ground floor of the mosque. But due to the increasing number of Muslims attending prayers, a second floor was added above the main prayer hall floor to accommodate the female worshipers.

Surrounding the main prayer hall is the Roman-style colonnade and Byzantium architectural style. The mosque corridors are filled with corbel arches that extend to both ends. The width and height of the column of the arches is harmoniously proportional. The square pegs of the arches are smoothed with round edges. Outer walls of the mosque are made by bricks and cut stones, decorated with mosaic tiles.

Other facilities include a reception hall, prayer hall, side arcades, administrative offices, library, reposing room and ablution rooms.

There are two Arabian date palm trees located at the mosque front yard garden.

Transportation
The mosque is accessible within walking distance south of Daan Park Station of Taipei Metro.

See also

 Islam in Taiwan
 Religion in Taiwan
 Chinese Muslim Youth League
 List of mosques in Taiwan

References

External links

  
 Islam in Taiwan — Saudi Aramco World
 YouTube - A Tour to Taipei's Heritage: Taipei Grand Mosque

1960 establishments in Taiwan
Taipei
Mosques completed in 1960
Mosques in Taipei
Rebuilt buildings and structures in Taiwan